Stanislav Vitalyevich Agkatsev (born 9 January 2002) is a Russian football goalkeeper who plays for FC Krasnodar and FC Krasnodar-2.

Club career
He made his debut in the Russian Professional Football League for FC Krasnodar-3 on 11 May 2019 in a game against FC Spartak Vladikavkaz.

He made his Russian Football National League debut for FC Krasnodar-2 on 31 August 2019 in a game against FC Shinnik Yaroslavl.

He made his debut for the main squad of FC Krasnodar on 25 February 2021 in a Europa League Round of 32 return leg against Dinamo Zagreb. The first-choice goalkeeper Matvei Safonov was injured at the time. He made his Russian Premier League debut for Krasnodar on 28 February 2021 in a game against FC Ural Yekaterinburg.

Career statistics

References

External links
 
 

2002 births
Sportspeople from Vladikavkaz
Living people
Russian footballers
Russia under-21 international footballers
Association football goalkeepers
FC Krasnodar-2 players
FC Krasnodar players
Russian Premier League players
Russian First League players
Russian Second League players